Gerald William Bagot, 5th Baron Bagot  (13 May 1866 – 5 April 1946), was the son of Vice-Admiral Henry Bagot (1846–1922) and Eleanor Chandos-Pole. He succeeded to the Barony of Bagot's Bromley and the Baronetcy of Blithfield Hall on the death of his second cousin William Bagot, 4th Baron Bagot, on 23 December 1932.

He was educated at Haileybury College, Hertfordshire. He sold the dilapidated family home of Blithfield Hall, Staffordshire, in 1945 to a waterworks company.

He was succeeded on his death in Staffordshire by his cousin Caryl.

References

 The Peer Page
 Baron Bagot

1866 births
1946 deaths
People educated at Haileybury and Imperial Service College
Gerald